In Liberia, the snap handshake or finger snap is a gesture of greeting, in which two people shake hands in the conventional Western way, but end the handshake with a mutual press of the fingers that creates a "snap" sound.

Apocryphally, the custom is attributed to the Americo-Liberian population of freed slaves, who created the gesture to contrast with slave owners' practice of breaking slaves' fingers.

During the 2014–2015 Ebola epidemic, handshaking in Liberia was curtailed, leading a BBC commentator to note that avoidance of handshaking was detrimental to the established custom of the Liberian handshake.

References

Greetings
Liberian culture
Hand gestures